Finis Elbert Wilson (December 9, 1888 in East Fork, Kentucky – March 9, 1959 in Coral Gables, Florida) was a professional baseball pitcher. He played part of 1914 and all of 1915 in Major League Baseball for the Brooklyn Tip-Tops of the Federal League.

Sources

Major League Baseball pitchers
Brooklyn Tip-Tops players
Knoxville Appalachians players
Knoxville Reds players
New Orleans Pelicans (baseball) players
Atlanta Crackers players
Baseball players from Kentucky
Sportspeople from Coral Gables, Florida
1888 births
1959 deaths